Rajendra Kumar Rai may refer to:

Rajendra Kumar Rai (Indian politician)
Rajendra Kumar Rai (Nepalese politician)
Rajendra Kumar Rai (Nepalese politician, born 1964)